Horst Kakl (born 16 January 1942) is an Austrian ice hockey player. He competed in the men's tournament at the 1964 Winter Olympics.

References

1942 births
Living people
Austrian ice hockey players
Olympic ice hockey players of Austria
Ice hockey players at the 1964 Winter Olympics
Moravian-German people
20th-century Austrian people